Ricardo Monreal Ávila (born September 19, 1960 in Fresnillo, Zacatecas) is a Mexican politician affiliated with the National Regeneration Movement (Morena). He is a senator and the Senate Majority Leader, a former Governor of Zacatecas and a former member of the Institutional Revolutionary Party (PRI) (and of the Party of the Democratic Revolution ) being closely identified during his tenure in that party with former president Carlos Salinas de Gortari.

Monreal Ávila graduated with a bachelor's degree in law from the Autonomous University of Zacatecas (UAZ) and with a Ph.D. in administrative and constitutional law from the National Autonomous University of Mexico (UNAM). He worked as a professor of law for several years and got involved in several agricultural programs and farmers' organizations during most of the 1980s.

In 1991 he became president of the state chapter of the Revolutionary Institutional Party, a political institution he represented twice at the Chamber of Deputies, once at the local congress and twice at the Senate. In 1998, after losing the PRI nomination for governor of Zacatecas, he switched sides and joined the left-of-center Party of the Democratic Revolution, winning the election with 44.6% of the votes.  He billed his victory as "the second taking of Zacatecas."

Monreal left the governorship in September 2004 and briefly considered to compete for the 2006 PRD presidential candidacy. Instead, he joined the presidential campaign of Andrés Manuel López Obrador, the former Head of Government of the Federal District. In the general election of 2 July 2006, he was elected to the Senate for the PRD as a national-list PR senator.

On 11 July 2018, after the landslide victory of the National Regeneration Movement during the 2018 Mexican general election, he was named President of MORENA in the Senate.

References

External links
 esmas.com: Ricardo Monreal
 Terra: Ricardo Monreal
 Revista Líderes Mexicanos: Ricardo Monreal

1960 births
Living people
Governors of Zacatecas
Members of the Chamber of Deputies (Mexico)
Presidents of the Chamber of Deputies (Mexico)
Members of the Senate of the Republic (Mexico)
Presidents of the Senate of the Republic (Mexico)
Party of the Democratic Revolution politicians
Politicians from Fresnillo, Zacatecas
20th-century Mexican lawyers
National Autonomous University of Mexico alumni
Institutional Revolutionary Party politicians
Morena (political party) politicians
21st-century Mexican politicians
20th-century Mexican politicians